Sigara is a genus of water boatmen in the family Corixidae. Some species within this genus are halophiles; for example, occurrences of the genus have been noted in the hypersaline Makgadikgadi Pans in Botswana.

Species
These 100 species belong to the genus Sigara:

 Sigara alluaudi (Kirkaldy, 1899) g
 Sigara alternata (Say, 1825) i c g b
 Sigara arguta
 Sigara assimilis (Fieber, 1848) g
 Sigara atomaria Illiger, 1807 g
 Sigara basalis (A.Costa, 1843) g
 Sigara bellula (Horváth, 1879) g
 Sigara berneri Hungerford and Hussey, 1957 i c g
 Sigara bicoloripennis (Walley, 1936) i c g
 Sigara bradleyi (Abbott, 1913) i c g
 Sigara compressoidea (Hungerford, 1928) i c g
 Sigara conocephala (Hungerford, 1926) i c g b
 Sigara cubiensis Hungerford, 1948 g
 Sigara daghestanica Jansson, 1983 g
 Sigara decorata (Abbott, 1916) i c g
 Sigara decoratella (Hungerford, 1926) i c g
 Sigara defecta Hungerford, 1948 i c g
 Sigara denseconscripta g
 Sigara depressa Hungerford, 1948 i c g
 Sigara distincta
 Sigara distorta (Distant, 1911) g
 Sigara dolabra Hungerford and Sailer, 1943 i c g
 Sigara dorsalis
 Sigara douglasensis (Hungerford, 1926) i c g
 Sigara falleni (Fieber, 1848) g
 Sigara fallenoidea (Hungerford, 1926) i c g
 Sigara formosana (Matsumura, 1915) g
 Sigara fossarum (Leach, 1817) g
 Sigara gordita (Abbott, 1913) i c g
 Sigara grossolineata Hungerford, 1948 i c g
 Sigara hellensii (C.R.Sahlberg, 1819) g
 Sigara hoggarica Poisson, 1929 g
 Sigara hubbelli (Hungerford, 1928) i c g
 Sigara hydratotrephes (Kirkaldy, 1908) i c g
 Sigara iactans Jansson, 1983 g
 Sigara italica Jaczewski, 1933 g
 Sigara janssoni Lucas Castro, 1983 g
 Sigara johnstoni Hungerford, 1948 i c g
 Sigara knighti Hungerford, 1948 i c g
 Sigara krafti Stonedahl, 1984 i c g
 Sigara lateralis (Leach, 1817) g
 Sigara lemana Fieber, 1860 g
 Sigara limitata (Fieber, 1848) g
 Sigara lineata (Forster, 1771) i c g b
 Sigara longipalis (J.Sahlberg, 1878) g
 Sigara mackinacensis (Hungerford, 1928) i c g b
 Sigara macrocepsoidea Hungerford, 1942 i c g
 Sigara macropala (Hungerford, 1926) i c g
 Sigara mathesoni Hungerford, 1948 i c g
 Sigara mayri (Fieber, 1860) g
 Sigara mckinstryi Hungerford, 1948 i c g
 Sigara meridionalis (Wallengren, 1875) g
 Sigara minuta Fabricius, 1794 g
 Sigara mississippiensis Hungerford, 1942 i c g
 Sigara modesta (Abbott, 1916) i c g
 Sigara mullettensis (Hungerford, 1928) i c g b
 Sigara nevadensis (Walley, 1936) i c g
 Sigara nigrolineata
 Sigara nigroventralis (Matsumura, 1905) g
 Sigara omani (Hungerford, 1930) i c g b
 Sigara ornata (Abbott, 1916) i c g b
 Sigara paludata Hungerford, 1942 i c g
 Sigara pectenata (Abbott, 1913) i c g
 Sigara penniensis (Hungerford, 1928) i c g
 Sigara platensis g
 Sigara quebecensis (Walley, 1930) i c g
 Sigara rubyae g
 Sigara saileri Wilson, 1953 i c g
 Sigara salgadoi Lucas Castro, 1983 g
 Sigara santiagiensis (Hungerford, 1928) g
 Sigara scabra (Abbott, 1913) i c g
 Sigara schadei Hungerford, 1928 g
 Sigara scholtzi Fieber, 1860 g
 Sigara scholtzii Scholtz, 1847 g
 Sigara scotti (Douglas & Scott, 1868) g
 Sigara scripta (Rambur, 1840) g
 Sigara selecta (Fieber, 1848) g
 Sigara semistriata (Fieber, 1848) g
 Sigara septemlineata (Paiva, 1918) g
 Sigara servadeii Tamanini, 1965 g
 Sigara sigmoidea (Abbott, 1913) i c g
 Sigara signata (Fieber, 1851) i c g
 Sigara solensis (Hungerford, 1926) i c g
 Sigara stagnalis (Leach, 1817) g
 Sigara stigmatica (Fieber, 1851) i c g
 Sigara striata (Linnaeus, 1758) i c g
 Sigara tadeuszi Lundblad, 1933 g
 Sigara takahashii Hungerford, 1940 g
 Sigara transfigurata (Walley, 1930) i c g
 Sigara trilineata (Provancher, 1872) i c g b
 Sigara truncatipala (Hale, 1922) g
 Sigara tucma g
 Sigara vallis Lauck, 1966 i c g
 Sigara vandykei Hungerford, 1948 i c g
 Sigara variabilis (Hungerford, 1926) i c g
 Sigara venusta (Douglas & Scott, 1869) g
 Sigara virginiensis Hungerford, 1948 i c g b
 Sigara washingtonensis Hungerford, 1948 i c g b
 Sigara yala g
 Sigara zimmermanni (Fieber, 1851) i c g

Data sources: i = ITIS, c = Catalogue of Life, g = GBIF, b = Bugguide.net

See also
 Extremophile

References

 
Corixini
Nepomorpha genera